The Livestock Indemnity Program (LIP) is a program periodically authorized and funded on an emergency basis by Congress to compensate livestock producers for losses caused by a natural disaster. Under the program, a payment is made to help producers defray the cost of replenishing their herds when livestock are killed by a natural disaster.

External links
 United States Department of Agriculture Agriculture Secretary Vilsack Announces New Livestock Indemnity Program - July 7, 2009

United States Department of Agriculture programs